Kelly Glacier is a steep tributary glacier descending southwest from Mount Peacock to enter Tucker Glacier just south of Mount Titus, in the Admiralty Mountains of Antarctica. It was mapped by the United States Geological Survey from surveys and U.S. Navy air photos, 1960–62, and was named by the Advisory Committee on Antarctic Names for Lieutenant Anthony J. Kelly, U.S. Navy, medical officer at Hallett Station, 1961.

References

Glaciers of Borchgrevink Coast